Collaboration Data Objects for Windows NT Server (CDONTS) is a component included with Microsoft's Windows NT and Windows 2000 server products.  It facilitates creating and sending e-mail messages from within web application scripts, typically ASP pages.  It is implemented as a COM component, and requires a locally installed SMTP server to handle mail delivery.

CDONTS was deprecated in Windows 2000, and removed completely in Windows Server 2003 in favour of a significantly improved interface, Collaboration Data Objects (CDOSYS).

External links
 MSKB 324649 - Description of CDONTS and how to troubleshoot CDONTS problems in Windows 2000 and in Windows NT 4.0
 MSKB 810702 - How to migrate the Collaboration Data Objects for NTS applications to Microsoft Collaboration Data Objects for Windows 2000
 Using CDOSYS with Coldfusion

Microsoft server technology